Alipour is a surname. Notable people with the surname include:

Ali Alipour (born 1994), Iranian footballer
Reza Alipour (born 1994), Iranian speed climber
Rozita Alipour (born 1989), Iranian karateka

Surnames of Iranian origin